Bernard C. Voorheis (May 23, 1922 – January 14, 2010) played professional basketball for the Rochester Royals, appearing in eight games in 1946, a year in which the team won the National Basketball League championship.

He grew up in the outlying Rochester suburb of Spencerport, New York, learning to play basketball in his father's barn.  In 1938, he graduated from Churchville-Chili High School.

In 1946, he was playing semi-pro basketball for the Atlas Wreckers.  Basketball Hall of Famer Les Harrison, the Royals coach at the time, saw Voorheis play and, noting his speed and ball-handling skills, signed him to a contract.

After his brief professional playing career, Voorheis went to work for Eastman Kodak for 35 years; he retired in 1983.

References

Bernie Voorheis' profile
Bernie Voorheis' obituary

1922 births
2010 deaths
American men's basketball players
Basketball players from New York (state)
Cornell Big Red men's basketball players
Guards (basketball)
People from Spencerport, New York
Rochester Royals players
Sportspeople from Rochester, New York